Eunephthya is a genus of soft corals in the family Nephtheidae. The genus is only known from South Africa

Species
Eunephthya celata McFadden & van Ofwegen, 2012
Eunephthya ericius McFadden & van Ofwegen, 2012
Eunephthya granulata McFadden & van Ofwegen, 2012
Eunephthya shirleyae McFadden & van Ofwegen, 2012
Eunephthya susanae (Williams, 1988)
Eunephthya thyrsoidea Verrill, 1869

References

Nephtheidae
Octocorallia genera